Club Esportiu Artà is a football team based in Artà, Illes Balears. Founded in 1945, the team plays in Tercera Regional.

The club's home ground is Ses Pesqueres.

Season to season

5 seasons in Tercera División

External links
Official website 
ffib.es profile

Football clubs in the Balearic Islands
Sport in Mallorca
Association football clubs established in 1945
Divisiones Regionales de Fútbol clubs
1945 establishments in Spain